Akal University is a private university in Talwandi Sabo, Bathinda, India. It is set up by Kalgidhar Society. It was established in 2015 under The Akal University Act, 2015 (Punjab Act No. 25 of 2015).

History
Akal University was approved by State Government in March 2015. Inauguration of Akal University took place on 17 July 2015.

Educational Programs
Akal University offers Bachelors as well as master's degree Honours programs in:
 Economics 
 Political Science
 Commerce
 Mathematics  
 Physics 
 Chemistry  
 Botany  
 Zoology  
 English  
 Punjabi
 Management
 Social Science
 Computer Science and Engineering
 Education
 Sri Guru Granth Sahib Studies

References

External links
 Official Website Akal University

Universities in Punjab, India
Private universities in India
Education in Bathinda
Educational institutions established in 2015
2015 establishments in Punjab, India